Compton Precinct is one of the eight precincts of Wabash County, Illinois. There is no incorporated community in the precinct.

Precincts in Wabash County, Illinois